The Nexus is the second studio album by Swedish-Danish heavy metal band Amaranthe. The album was released on varying dates in March 2013, starting on the 13th in Japan and concluding on the 26th in the US. The Nexus is a development of the sound and ideas Amaranthe introduced on their first record. The band stated that they felt "the contrasts are greater, the mix and blends of genres is more controversial, and more creative freedoms were taken in this album." It was the last album with harsh vocalist Andy Solveström.

Track listing

Personnel

Amaranthe
Elize Ryd – clean vocals (female)
Jake E – clean vocals (male)
Andy Solveström – harsh vocals
Olof Mörck – guitars, keyboards
Johan Andreassen – bass
Morten Løwe Sørensen – drums

Production
 Jacob Hansen – production, engineer, mixing, mastering
 Olof Mörck – production
 Jake E – production

Miscellaneous
 Gustavo Sazes – cover art, booklet design
 Leticia Dumas – additional artwork photos
 Johan Carlén – band photos

Charts

Scheduled release history

References

2013 albums
Amaranthe albums
Spinefarm Records albums
Albums produced by Jacob Hansen